Aung Moe Htwe (born 5 February 1995) is a Burmese footballer who currently plays as a defender for Hanthawaddy United F.C.

Career statistics

Club

Notes

References

External links
 

1995 births
Living people
Burmese footballers
Association football defenders
Myanmar National League players
Hanthawaddy United F.C. players